Love Remains is an album by saxophonist Robert Watson which was recorded in 1986 and released on the Italian Red label.

Reception

On AllMusic, Scott Yanow observed "the high-quality music is essentially advanced hard bop and gives Watson a good opportunity to stretch out on some challenging structures".

The Penguin Guide to Jazz Recordings listed the album as part of its suggested "core collection" of essential recordings.

Track listing 
All compositions by Bobby Watson except where noted.

 "The Misery of Ebop" – 9:06
 "Love Remains" (Bobby Watson, Pamela Watson) – 9:22
 "Blues for Alto" – 6:06
 "Ode for Aaron" – 3:36
 "Dark Days (For Nelson Mandela)" – 6:22
 "Sho Thang" (Curtis Lundy) – 4:48
 "The Love We Had Yesterday" – 5:58

Personnel 
Robert Watson – alto saxophone
John Hicks – piano
Curtis Lundy – bass
Marvin "Smitty" Smith – drums

References 

Bobby Watson albums
1986 albums
Red Records albums